The 2018 FIVB Volleyball Men's World Championship was the 19th staging of the FIVB Volleyball Men's World Championship, contested by the senior men's national teams of the members of the  (FIVB), the sport's global governing body. The final tournament was held in Italy and Bulgaria from 9 to 30 September 2018. For the first time, the tournament was jointly-hosted by more than one country. The final six was hosted by Italy at the Pala Alpitour in Turin.

Poland defended their world title, defeating the reigning Olympic champions Brazil in straight sets at a repeat of the 2014 final. This was Poland's third title overall, and the third time in the last four editions of the World Championship that Brazil and Poland contested the final. This was also the fifth straight World Championship with Brazil reaching at least the final. United States won the 3rd place match, defeating Serbia in four sets. Bartosz Kurek from Poland was elected the MVP.

The first round match between Russia and Tunisia set the new all-time lowest-scoring record in a World Championship set since the new volleyball scoring rules were adopted, with Russia winning the second set by 25–6. The previous record was a 25–8 achieved by United States against Puerto Rico during the 2014 World Championship.

Host selection
On 9 December 2015, FIVB announced that the tournament would be held in Italy and Bulgaria. For the first time the championship will take place in more than one country. The tournament will take place in six Italian cities (Bari, Bologna,
Florence, Assago, Rome and Turin) and three Bulgarian cities (Ruse, Varna and Sofia).

Both Italy and Bulgaria have previously hosted the Men's World Championship. Italy last organised the 2010 edition, when Brazil claimed the title their third straight title. Italy also hosted the men's event in 1978 as well as the 2014 Women's World Championship. Moreover, Italy hosted the 1985 Men's U21 World Championship, the 1985 Women's U20 World Championship and the 2009 Boys' U19 World Championship. Bulgaria, on the other hand, hosted both the men's and women's senior editions in 1970. Both countries have also played hosts to other important volleyball competitions, including the Men's European Volleyball Championship and the World League final round.

Qualification

The qualification process was a series of tournaments organised by the five FIVB confederations to decide 21 of the 24 teams which would play in the final tournament, with Italy and Bulgaria qualifying automatically as hosts and Poland also qualifying automatically as the defending champions. All remaining FIVB member associations were eligible to enter the qualifying process.

At first, 150 associations registered teams to compete in the qualification process, but 19 associations withdrew from the qualifying process after they registered and India were suspended and then expelled from taking part in the process as a punishment for internal problems in the India Volleyball Federation.

The five regional governing bodies were allocated the remaining 21 spots; CAVB (Africa) was granted three, AVC (Asia and Oceania) four, NORCECA (North America) five, CSV (South America) two, and CEV (Europe) seven spots.

Of the 24 nations qualified to play at the 2018 World Championship, 20 countries competed at the previous tournament in 2014. Slovenia qualified for the first time. Other teams returning after absences of the last tournament(s) include: Dominican Republic, returning to the finals after their only previous appearance in 1974, Netherlands, who last competed in 2002, and Japan, who missed the 2014 edition.

Notable countries that failed to qualify include the 2014 third placed Germany, Venezuela (for the first time since 1998), South Korea and Czech Republic.

Qualified teams

Format
First round
In the first round, the 24 teams were spread across four pools of six teams playing in a single round-robin format. The top four teams in each pool qualified for the second round, featuring four pools of four teams playing in four cities.

Second round
The second round featured four pools of four teams playing once again in a single round-robin format. At the end of the second round matches, the rankings of the four pools were drawn up taking into account the points scored by each team in the first and second rounds. The four pool-winning teams of the second round qualified for the third round, together with the top two of the second placed teams.

Third round
The six teams competing in the third round were divided into two three-team pools by a draw. After the matches played once again in a single round-robin format, the top two teams in each pool qualified for the semifinals and finals.

Final round
The third round pool winners played against the runners-up in this round. The semifinals winners advanced to compete for the World Championship title. The losers faced each other in the 3rd place match.

Pools composition

First round
Teams were seeded in the first two positions of each pool following the serpentine system according to their FIVB World Ranking as of 7 July 2017. FIVB reserved the right to seed the hosts as head of pools A and D regardless of the World Ranking. All teams not seeded were drawn to take other available positions in the remaining lines, following the World Ranking. Each pool had no more than three teams from the same confederation. The draw was held in Florence, Italy on 30 November 2017. Rankings are shown in brackets except the hosts Italy and Bulgaria who ranked 4th and 14th respectively.

Draw

Second round

Third round
The third round draw was held in Turin, Italy on 24 September 2018. The 1st ranked teams of pools E and F were drawn in pools I and J consecutively and the 1st ranked teams of pools G and H were also drawn in pools I and J consecutively. The 1st best second team among the four pools was placed in pool I, while the 2nd best second team among the four pools was placed in pool J.

Squads

Venues

Pool standing procedure
 Total number of victories (matches won, matches lost)
 In the event of a tie, the following first tiebreaker will apply: The teams will be ranked by the most points gained per match as follows:
Match won 3–0 or 3–1: 3 points for the winner, 0 points for the loser
Match won 3–2: 2 points for the winner, 1 point for the loser
Match forfeited: 3 points for the winner, 0 points (0–25, 0–25, 0–25) for the loser
 If teams are still tied after examining the number of victories and points gained, then the FIVB will examine the results in order to break the tie in the following order:
Sets quotient: if two or more teams are tied on the number of points gained, they will be ranked by the quotient resulting from the division of the number of all sets won by the number of all sets lost.
Points quotient: if the tie persists based on the sets quotient, the teams will be ranked by the quotient resulting from the division of all points scored by the total of points lost during all sets.
If the tie persists based on the points quotient, the tie will be broken based on the team that won the match of the Round Robin Phase between the tied teams. When the tie in points quotient is between three or more teams, these teams ranked taking into consideration only the matches involving the teams in question.

Opening matches
The opening matches of the 2018 World Championship, jointly hosted by Italy and Bulgaria held With the presence of the president Sergio Mattarella and Rumen Radev. President of Italy Mattarella was guest of honour as co-hosts Italy got their 2018 campaign off to the perfect start with a 3–0 victory over Japan. Alongside FIVB President Ary Graça, Italian National Olympic Committee President Giovanni Malago, President of the Italian Volleyball Federation Pietro Bruno Cattaneo and many more national and international dignitaries, President Mattarella joined the 11,170-strong partisan crowd at Foro Italico Tennis Center Court, Rome and in Varna, the home side Bulgaria fared just as successfully as their co-hosts, sweeping aside Finland 3–0 to take a commanding lead in Pool D, were present President of Bulgaria Radev was joined by his Minister for Sport, Krasen Kralev, at Palace of Culture and Sports.

First round
The top four teams in each pool qualified for the second round.

Pool A
All times are Central European Summer Time (UTC+02:00).

|}

|}

Pool B
All times are Eastern European Summer Time (UTC+03:00).

|}

|}

Pool C
All times are Central European Summer Time (UTC+02:00).

|}

|}

Pool D
All times are Eastern European Summer Time (UTC+03:00).

|}

|}

Second round
The standings of the four pools were drawn up taking into account the wins and points scored by each team in the first and second round.
The winners in each pool and the top two of the second placed teams qualified for the third round.

Pool E
All times are Central European Summer Time (UTC+02:00).

|}

|}

Pool F
All times are Central European Summer Time (UTC+02:00).

|}

|}

Pool G
All times are Eastern European Summer Time (UTC+03:00).

|}

|}

Pool H
All times are Eastern European Summer Time (UTC+03:00).

|}

|}

Ranking of the second placed teams
The top two of the second placed teams qualified for the third round.

|}

Third round
All times are Central European Summer Time (UTC+02:00).
The top two teams in each pool qualified for the semifinals.

Pool I

|}

|}

Pool J

|}

|}

Final round
All times are Central European Summer Time (UTC+02:00).

Semifinals

|}

3rd place match

|}

Final

|}

Final standing

Awards

Most Valuable Player
 Bartosz Kurek
Best Setter
 Micah Christenson
Best Outside Spikers
 Michał Kubiak
 Douglas Souza

Best Middle Blockers
 Lucas Saatkamp
 Piotr Nowakowski
Best Opposite Spiker
 Matt Anderson
Best Libero
 Paweł Zatorski

Statistics leaders

The statistics of each group follows the vis reports P2 and P3. The statistics include 6 volleyball skills; serve, reception, set, spike, block, and dig. The table below shows the top 5 ranked players in each skill plus top scorers at the completion of the tournament. Only players whose teams advanced to the final round are taken in consideration.

Marketing

Sponsors
Italy
Intesa Sanpaolo
Honda
Arriva 
Kinder
Fastweb
Atlantia S.p.A.
Trenitalia
Iren
Crai

Bulgaria
Lidl
First Investment Bank
Volkswagen 
Holiday Heroes
Novatrade Ltd
Bulgariatravel

Trophy

Comparable 2014 year the FIVB then mandated two young product designers from Switzerland, Thilo Alex Brunner and Jörg Mettler to create the new World Championship trophy. With its unique contemporary design, the trophy has set itself apart from other awards in international competitions across the sporting world. Eichenberger LTD and their mastermind, Juan Franco, have been responsible for its production. The company specialises in complex metal works mainly for the Swiss watchmaking and jewellery industry. The trophy was constructed using 12 individual pieces, representing each member of a volleyball team. The pieces are brought together in a seamless cylindrical design, symbolising the coming together of the 12 players using the rotation system on the court.

Broadcasting rights
FIVB, through several companies, sold the broadcasting rights for the 2018 World Championship to the following broadcasters.

See also

2018 FIVB Volleyball Women's World Championship

References

External links
Fédération Internationale de Volleyball – official website
2018 Men's World Championship – official website
Competition Formula

 
2018
FIVB World Championship
World Championship, Men, 2018
World Championship, Men, 2018
2018 in Bulgarian sport
2018 in Italian sport
September 2018 sports events in Italy
September 2018 sports events in Europe
VWCH 2018 Men
VWCH 2018 Men
VWCH 2018 Men
VWCH 2018 Men
VWCH 2018 Men
VWCH 2018 Men
VWCH 2018 Men
VWCH 2018 Men
VWCH 2018 Men